Linval Crawford (1 June 1959 – 30 May 1992) was a Jamaican cricketer. He played in one List A match for the Jamaican cricket team in 1987/88.

See also
 List of Jamaican representative cricketers

References

External links
 

1959 births
1992 deaths
Jamaican cricketers
Jamaica cricketers